Hemidictyini is a tribe of cicadas in the family Cicadidae, found in the Neotropics and tropical Africa. There are at least two genera and two described species in Hemidictyini.

Genera
These genera belong to the tribe Hemidictyini:
 Hemidictya Burmeister, 1835 i c g
 Hovana Distant, 1905 c g
Data sources: i = ITIS, c = Catalogue of Life, g = GBIF, b = Bugguide.net
 Bafutalna Boulard, 1993
 Iruana Distant, 1905
 Lacetas Karsch, 1890
 Murphyalna Boulard, 2012
 Sapantanga Distant, 1905

References

Further reading

 
 
 
 
 
 
 
 
 
 

Cicadettinae
Hemiptera tribes